The Men's 1 km time trial event of the 2009 UCI Track Cycling World Championships was held on 27 March 2009.

Results

References

Men's 1 km time trial
UCI Track Cycling World Championships – Men's 1 km time trial